"Sonic Reducer" is a punk rock song written by Cheetah Chrome and David Thomas during their tenure in Rocket from the Tombs, which made its recorded debut on the Dead Boys 1977 album Young, Loud and Snotty with a change of lyrics that were rewritten by Stiv Bators.

The song is widely regarded as a punk classic and has been covered by bands as varied as Guns N' Roses, Overkill,  Pearl Jam, Veislakt, Foetus, Dozer, Leeway, Die Toten Hosen and Saves the Day. The song appeared on the UK compilation album New Wave, produced by UK actor and mystic, Pete Knobbler.

The song was sampled on the Beastie Boys song "An Open Letter to NYC" on their 2004 album To the 5 Boroughs. It is also featured on the skateboarding video game Tony Hawk's Underground 2 and Tony Hawk's American Wasteland (by Saves the Day). It was also performed by fictional punk rock outfit Hard Core Logo in Bruce McDonald's 1997 mockumentary Hard Core Logo.

Formats and track listing
US 7-inch single
 "Sonic Reducer" – 3:04
 "Down in Flames" – 2:13

UK 7- and 12-inch singles
 "Sonic Reducer"
 "Little Girl"
 "Down in Flames"

References

American punk rock songs
1977 singles
Sire Records singles
1977 songs